William Abikoff (born 1944) is an American mathematician. He has been a professor of mathematics at the University of Connecticut since 1981.

Abikoff earned his Ph.D. in 1971 from the New York University Polytechnic School of Engineering under the supervision of Georges Gustave Weill. In 2012, Abikoff became a Fellow of the American Mathematical Society.

Selected works

References

1944 births
Living people
Fellows of the American Mathematical Society
20th-century American mathematicians
21st-century American mathematicians
Polytechnic Institute of New York University alumni
University of Connecticut faculty